K12 was to be AMD's first custom microarchitecture based on the ARMv8-A (AArch64) instruction set with a planned release in 2017. Its predecessor, the Opteron A1100 series, also ARMv8-A, used ARM Cortex-A57 cores. As of 2023 the product has officially been canceled.

The microarchitecture was to focus on high frequency and power efficiency and was to target the dense server, embedded and semi-custom market segments.

See also 
 Zen (microarchitecture)

References 

ARM architecture
AMD microarchitectures